Keota is an unincorporated community in Macon County, in the U.S. state of Missouri.

History
Keota had its start in 1900 as a coal town. A post office called Keota was established in 1900, and remained in operation until 1925.

References

Unincorporated communities in Macon County, Missouri
Unincorporated communities in Missouri